Stefan Hablützel (born 31 March 1958) is a Swiss rower. He competed in the men's coxed pair event at the 1972 Summer Olympics.

References

1958 births
Living people
Swiss male rowers
Olympic rowers of Switzerland
Rowers at the 1972 Summer Olympics
Place of birth missing (living people)